Phaeodactylibacter xiamenensis  is a Gram-negative, aerobic, rod-shaped, chemoheterotrophic and non-motile bacterium from the genus of Rubidimonas which has been isolated from the  alga Phaeodactylum tricornutum from Xiamen in China.

References 

Bacteroidota
Bacteria described in 2014